Kendrickichthys is an extinct monospecific genus of arthrodire placoderm from the Early Frasnian stage of the Late Devonian period. Fossils are found in the Gogo Formation of the Kimberley region of Australia. It was thought to be durophagous, meaning that it preyed upon hard-shelled creatures such as mollusks.

Phylogeny
Kendrickichthys is a basal member of the clade Aspinothoracidi, which belongs to the clade Pachyosteomorphi, one of the two major clades within Eubrachythoraci. The cladogram below shows the phylogeny of Kendrickichthys:

References 

Arthrodires